Slaughterville is a town in Cleveland County, Oklahoma, United States, and located in the Oklahoma City metropolitan area. As of the 2010 census, the city population was 4,137.

The community is made up of mostly homes on acreages so it has retained a rural type of land use. Much of the area is wooded and has a natural scenic outdoor appeal to residents and visitors.

History
Slaughterville was named after a grocery store run by James Slaughter in the early 20th century.

The site was located in the Unassigned Lands of Indian Territory. It was opened to settlement in the Land Run of 1889. The first building was erected in the same year. The town did not incorporate until 1970, to avoid annexation by either Norman, Noble, or Lexington.

Slaughterville encompassed  at incorporation.

The town name was the subject of controversy in 2004 when People for the Ethical Treatment of Animals (PETA) asked Slaughterville to rename the town to Veggieville, offering a donation of $20,000 of veggie burgers as incentive. Slaughterville's town council heard presentations by members of PETA and local citizens before voting against the suggestion.

Geography
Slaughterville is located in southern Cleveland County at  (35.083584, -97.286945). It is bordered to the north by the city of Norman and to the northwest by Noble. Part of its western border touches the Canadian River, across which is McClain County.

U.S. Route 77 passes through the town, leading north  to the center of Oklahoma City and south  to Purcell.

Demographics

In 2015, there were 4,217 people, 1,431 households, and 1,119 families residing in the town. There were 1,614 housing units at an average density of 42.4 per square mile (16.4/km2). The racial makeup of the town was 86.1% White, 6.6% Native American, and 7.2% from two or more races. Hispanic or Latino of any race were 2.2% of the population.

There were 1,431 households, out of which 35.6% had children under the age of 18 living with them, 62.2% were married couples living together, 13.1% had a female householder with no husband present, and 21.8% were non-families. 14.7% of all households were made up of individuals, and 4.0% had someone living alone who was 65 years of age or older. The average household size was 2.95 and the average family size was 3.33.

In the town, the population was spread out, with 28.5% under the age of 18, 9.1% from 18 to 24, 19.9% from 25 to 44, 30.0% from 45 to 64, and 12.5% who were 65 years of age or older. The median age was 39 years. For every 100 females, there were 85.2 males. For every 100 females age 18 and over, there were 86.8 males.

The median income for a household in the town was $50,982, and the median income for a family was $55,023. The per capita income for the town was $20,011. About 7.4% of families and 11.4% of the population were below the poverty line, including 15.3% of those under age 18 and 3.4% of those age 65 or over.

See also

 Extreme Makeover: Home Edition (season 7)

References

External links
 Town of Slaughterville official website

Oklahoma City metropolitan area
Towns in Cleveland County, Oklahoma
Towns in Oklahoma